The Manitoba Provincial Road 283  is a provincial road in Manitoba, Canada which succeeds Saskatchewan Highway 9 at the Saskatchewan - Manitoba provincial boundary  and terminates at Manitoba Highway PTH 10 in The Pas.  

PR 283 is paved for is entire length, and the speed limit is 100 km/h. The highway is a part of the Northern Woods and Water Route.

Major intersections

References

283
Northern Woods and Water Route

Transport in The Pas